"True Love" is a song by American musician and singer-songwriter Glenn Frey, a member of the Eagles. It was released as a single from his third studio solo album Soul Searchin', in 1988. The single features a ballad version of the track, "Working Man" as the B-side. An uptempo version was included on the album.

Background
In the liner notes to the original album Glenn Frey wrote of the song "For those of you who have my previous albums, I apologize. I just can't shake my obsession with this Al Green-Memphis thing. Like Wilson Pickett says, 'Don't fight it'."

Reception
The song was one of Frey's biggest hit singles in his solo career, peaking at No. 13 on the Billboard Hot 100 and No. 2 on both the U.S. Adult Contemporary chart and Canadian singles chart.  It also peaked at No. 49 on the Australian charts.

Cash Box said that it's "a classic R&B tune replete with hornbreaks and soul-tinged arrangement and production."

Chart performance

Weekly charts

Year-end charts

Personnel 
 Glenn Frey – lead and backing vocals, keyboards, guitars, bass, drums, horn arrangements 
 Barry Beckett – keyboards
 Robbie Buchanan – keyboards
 Ralph MacDonald – percussion
 Chris Mostert – saxophone
 The Heart Attack Horns – horns
 Julia Waters – backing vocals
 Maxine Waters – backing vocals
 Greg Smith – horn arrangements

References

External links
 

1988 singles
Glenn Frey songs
MCA Records singles
Songs written by Jack Tempchin
Songs written by Glenn Frey
1988 songs